Stefan Marković (born April 25, 1988) is a Serbian professional basketball player for Crvena zvezda of the Adriatic League and the EuroLeague. He also represented the Serbia national basketball team internationally.

Professional career
Marković began his professional career with KK Atlas. From 2006 to 2010 he was member of Hemofarm. Season 2010–11 he spent in Italy playing with Benetton Treviso.

In June 2011 he signed a two-years plus an option for a third one contract with Valencia Basket in Spain. In July 2013, negotiations for a new contract fell apart and he became a free agent. In October 2013, he signed a one-year deal with Banvit. On June 27, 2014, Marković signed a two-year deal with Unicaja.

On August 13, 2016, Marković signed a one-year deal with Russian club Zenit Saint Petersburg.

On June 23, 2017, Marković signed a two-year deal with Russian club Khimki. In 2018–19 season, he averaged  6.1 points, 4.4 assists and 2.1 rebounds in 23.3 minutes of action in the EuroLeague and 6.3 points, 5.0 assists, 3.2 rebounds in VTB United League. On July 18, 2019, Khimki parted ways with Marković.

On August 2, 2019, Marković signed a contract with the Italian team Virtus Bologna. After having knocked out 3–0 both Basket Treviso in the quarterfinals and New Basket Brindisi in the semifinals, on 11 June 2021 Virtus defeated 4–0 its historic rival Olimpia Milan in the national finals, winning its 16th national title and the first one after twenty years.

On November 8, 2021, Marković has signed with Crvena zvezda of the Adriatic League. The club won ABA League, Serbian League, and Serbian Cup in the 2021–22 season.

Serbian national team

Marković played with the senior Serbian national basketball team at the EuroBasket 2009, where he won the silver medal. He has been a member of the Serbian national team at the 2010 FIBA World Championship where Serbia was defeated by Lithuania in the game for the bronze medal. He was capped once more for the national team of Serbia at the EuroBasket 2011 in Lithuania where Serbia finished 8th.

Marković represented the national basketball at the EuroBasket 2013. He was also a member of the Serbian national basketball team that won the silver medal at the 2014 FIBA Basketball World Cup under new head coach Aleksandar Đorđević.

He also represented Serbia at the EuroBasket 2015. In the first phase of the tournament, Serbia dominated in the toughest Group B with 5-0 record, and then eliminated Finland and Czech Republic in the round of 16 and quarterfinal game, respectively. However, they were stopped in the semifinal game by Lithuania with 67–64, and eventually lost to the host team France in the bronze-medal game with 81–68. Over 9 tournament games, Marković averaged 5.1 points, 1.9 rebounds and 2.6 assists per game on 39.1% shooting from the field.

Marković also represented Serbia at the 2016 Summer Olympics where they won the silver medal, after losing to the United States in the final game with 96–66. After the tournament, Marković announced his retirement from the national team.

Career statistics

EuroLeague

|-
| style="text-align:left;"| 2014–15
| style="text-align:left;" rowspan=2| Unicaja
| 21 || 16 || 18.9 || .341 || .279 || .667 || 2.4 || 3.4 || .7 || .0 || 4.0 || 5.2
|-
| style="text-align:left;"| 2015–16
| 10 || 6 || 22.3 || .314 || .208 || .818 || 2.1 || 4.9 || .5 || .0 || 3.6 || 7.0
|-
| style="text-align:left;"| 2017–18
| style="text-align:left;" rowspan=2| Khimki
| 33 || 11 || 23.7 || .317 || .266 || .841 || 2.3 || 3.8 || 1.3 || .1 || 5.0 || 7.2
|-
| style="text-align:left;"| 2018–19
| 27 || 0 || 23.8 || .388 || .349 || .750 || 2.1 || 4.4 || .8 || .0 || 6.1 || 7.9
|- class="sortbottom"
| style="text-align:center;" colspan=2 | Career
| 91 || 33 || 22.5 || .345 || .291 || .773 || 2.3 || 4.0 || .9 || .0 || 4.9 || 6.9

See also 
List of Olympic medalists in basketball

References

External links

Stefan Marković at acb.com
Stefan Marković at draftexpress.com
Stefan Marković at euroleague.net
Stefan Marković at fiba.com

1988 births
Living people
2010 FIBA World Championship players
2014 FIBA Basketball World Cup players
ABA League players
Bandırma B.İ.K. players
Baloncesto Málaga players
Basketball League of Serbia players
Basketball players from Belgrade
Basketball players at the 2016 Summer Olympics
BC Khimki players
BC Zenit Saint Petersburg players
KK Beopetrol/Atlas Beograd players
KK Crvena zvezda players
KK Hemofarm players
Lega Basket Serie A players
Liga ACB players
Medalists at the 2016 Summer Olympics
Olympic basketball players of Serbia
Olympic medalists in basketball
Olympic silver medalists for Serbia
Pallacanestro Treviso players
Point guards
Serbia men's national basketball team players
Serbian expatriate basketball people in Italy
Serbian expatriate basketball people in Russia
Serbian expatriate basketball people in Spain
Serbian expatriate basketball people in Turkey
Serbian men's basketball players
Shooting guards
Valencia Basket players
Virtus Bologna players